Vikky Varun (born Santhosh Kumar R; on 28 May) (also credited as Vikky Varun) is an Indian actor who works in Kannada cinema. He worked as an assistant director for Duniya Soori and Yogaraj Bhat before making his debut in films in 2013 with a cameo appearance in Kaddipudi. His first film in a lead role came in Kendasampige (2015) which earned him wide appreciations and nominations under the best debut actor category at the Filmfare Awards South and SIIMA Awards.

Early life
He completed his B.Com degree at the Mysore University. His strong interest towards film making made him to approach leading film directors Yogaraj Bhat and Duniya Soori and bagged the opportunity to work as an associate and later assistant director for both of them.

Career 
Soon after being employed as an associate director, Vikky assisted director Duniya Soori in films such as Jackie, Anna Bond and Kaddipudi, where he also played a brief role. Later, he assisted Yogaraj Bhat in the film Paramathma. He considered Soori as his protege and upon his insistence, he agreed to star as a lead role in the director's offbeat film Kendasampige opposite another debutant Manvitha Harish in 2015. The film went on to one among the top grossers of the year and also screened for hundred days across cinema halls. Subsequently, he was nominated for the best debut actor in both SIIMA and Filmfare Awards South.

Following the success of his debut film, Vikky took a year break and chose Alemari fame Santhu's next directorial subject titled College Kumar opposite Samyuktha Hegde.

Vicky will be acting as main lead along with Shilpa Manjunath in the upcoming Kannada movie 'Ranga BE, Mtech' directed by Nagesh Karthi.

Filmography

References

External links 
 

Living people
Indian male film actors
21st-century Indian male actors
Male actors from Mysore
Male actors in Kannada cinema
Year of birth missing (living people)